Protomedetera is a genus of flies in the family Dolichopodidae. The genus contains four species, and is found in Papua New Guinea, Singapore, Malaysia, and Indonesia.

The generic name is a combination of proto and Medetera, referring to the genus looking like a small and simplified Medetera.

Species
 Protomedetera biconvexa Tang, Grootaert & Yang, 2018
 Protomedetera biseta Tang, Grootaert & Yang, 2018
 Protomedetera glabra Tang, Grootaert & Yang, 2018
 Protomedetera singaporensis Grootaert & Tang, 2018

References 

Dolichopodidae genera
Medeterinae
Diptera of Asia
Diptera of Australasia